Discovery Bridge may refer to:

 Discovery Bridge (Columbus, Ohio), connecting downtown Columbus and Franklinton
 Discovery Bridge (Missouri), connecting Saint Louis County with Saint Charles County, Missouri
 Discovery Bridge (Yankton), completed in 2008 across the Missouri River, connecting Nebraska with Yankton, South Dakota